Expedition may refer to:

 An exploration, journey, or voyage undertaken by a group of people especially for discovery and scientific research

Places
 Expedition Island, a park in Green River, Wyoming, US
 Expedition Range, a mountain range in Queensland, Australia

Arts, entertainment, and media
Expedition (book), a science-fiction novel by Wayne Douglas Barlowe
Expedition Magazine, published by Penn Museum 
Expedition! (1960-62), an American travel documentary television series
Expedition, included in the List of Pokémon Trading Card Game sets
Expeditions (poetry collection), a collection of poetry by Margaret Atwood
L'Expédition, a volume of the French science fiction comic series Les Mondes d'Aldébaran, part of the Bételgeuse graphic novel
L'expédition,  a novel by Agnès Desarthe  
L'Expédition,  written by cartoonist Richard Marazano
Northern Exposure: Expeditions, album by Sasha and John Digweed (1999)
L'expédition, an album by Les Cowboys Fringants (2008)
The Expedition, a 2000 live album by  Kamelot
"The Expedition", an episode of the Doctor Who serial The Daleks
"Expedition", a song by Sara Groves from the album Floodplain

Sports
Expedition bicycling, a subset of long-distance bicycle touring, which typically involves long journeys over tough terrain
 Expedition races, long adventure races which combine two or more endurance disciplines
 Expedition Trophy, the world's longest winter motor rally, which runs 12,500 km from Murmansk to Vladivostok, Russia

Transportation
 Expedition Airways, a defunct airline based in Zimbabwe
 Expedition bicycle, a type of touring bicycle
 Ford Expedition, a full-size sport utility vehicle made by Ford Motor Company
 MS Expedition, an expedition cruise ship

Other uses
 Expeditionary warfare, a deployment of a state's military to fight abroad, especially away from established bases
 ISS Expedition, a permanent crew on board the International Space Station

See also
Xpedition (disambiguation)